The Eagle 73A and Eagle 74A, also designated as the Eagle FA-73 and Eagle FA-74, respectively, were race cars designed and built by Eagle for use in Formula 5000 racing and made their racing debut in 1973, and competed until 1974. Both the Eagle 73A and 74A were powered by the commonly used 5.0-liter Chevrolet V8 engine.

References

Formula 5000 cars
Eagle racing cars